Tender Touches is an American adult animated series created by David Bonawits, Lauren Payne, and Maxime Simonet, that premiered on December 18, 2017, on Adult Swim. Season 2 premiered on November 26, 2018, with season 3 airing a sneak peek on March 31, 2020, followed by the actual premiere on June 15, 2020.

Background 
The series is a parody of soap operas and was based on a segment from Bloodfeast created by hosts Dave Bonawits and Maxime Simonet of FishCenter Live fame.  It was introduced in 2017 at a showcase of Adult Swim pilots as part of their "On The Green" tour across the United States. 

For the first two seasons, the series included two versions of each episode. One was the regular episode, and the other was a musical. Starting with the third season, the musical version of the episode was discontinued. The series is characterized by improvisation, inconsistent audio and voice-acting quality, and numerous fourth wall breaks.

Broadcast and release

Episodes

Nielsen ratings

The first episode "Heated Floors" was watched by 0.729 million viewers on its first broadcast on Adult Swim and "Heated Floors: Operetta" was watched by 0.63 million viewers. On Thursday, 21 December 2017, Tender Touches ranked third in the Top 3 after NBA basketball with 911,000 viewers.

Reception 
Geeks Jose Rodriguez praised the show with "holy crap this show is hilarious [...] [I]t's exactly the kind of offbeat, disturbing, and hilarious show that Adult Swim used to make. Bubbleblabbers John Schwarz reviewed Tender Touches favorably, saying "you're in for a real surprise."

References

See also

List of adult animated television series
List of animated television series of 2017
List of programs broadcast by Adult Swim

External links
 
 

2010s American adult animated television series
2010s American black comedy television series
2010s American parody television series
2020s American adult animated television series
2020s American black comedy television series
2020s American parody television series
2017 American television series debuts
2020 American television series endings
American adult animated comedy television series
American adult animated television spin-offs
English-language television shows
Adult Swim original programming
Television series by Williams Street